Events from the year 1840 in China.

Incumbents 
 Daoguang Emperor (20th year)

Viceroys
 Viceroy of Zhili —  
 Viceroy of Min-Zhe — 
 Viceroy of Huguang — 
 Viceroy of Shaan-Gan — ?
 Viceroy of Liangguang —  
 Viceroy of Yun-Gui — 
 Viceroy of Sichuan — 
 Viceroy of Liangjiang —

Events

Ongoing
 Opium War

References

 
China